Hannah Little (born 21 July 2001) is an Irish cricketer who plays for Scorchers and Ireland. In August 2019, she was named in the Irish Women's Twenty20 International (WT20I) squad for the 2019 Netherlands Women's Quadrangular Series. She made her WT20I debut for Ireland, against the Netherlands, on 8 August 2019. In July 2020, she was awarded a non-retainer contract by Cricket Ireland for the following year.

References

External links
 
 

2001 births
Living people
Irish women cricketers
Ireland women Twenty20 International cricketers
Place of birth missing (living people)
Typhoons (women's cricket) cricketers
Dragons (women's cricket) cricketers
Scorchers (women's cricket) cricketers